Robbie Weiss (born December 1, 1966) is a former tour professional tennis player and NCAA Division 1 singles champion.  The resident of Las Vegas achieved a career-high ATP ranking in singles of world No. 85, which he reached on the heels of winning his only ATP Tour event, the 1990 São Paulo Grand Prix.  He also won, partnering Ricky Brown, the 1984 Wimbledon Championships junior doubles title.

Weiss played just a few tournaments on the ITF Junior Circuit and his only notable junior success was winning Wimbledon doubles crown in '84 partnering Brown.  They won the final over Jonas Svensson and Mark Kratzmann despite losing the first set 1–6.  As a collegian, Weiss won the 1988 NCAA Division 1 individual singles title despite being ranked only No. 48 in that year's preseason rankings.  He did win however three individuals singles tournaments to raise his ranking to No. 1 entering the individual singles championship.  In the title match, Weiss defeated UCLA's Brian Garrow 6–2, 4–6, 6–3 to become the first Pepperdine University player win an individual singles title.  Weiss was an All-American selection 1986 and again in 1988.  In '86 the Waves lost the team championship finals to Stanford.

Turning pro shortly after winning the NCAA individual title, Weiss scored tour singles match wins over at the time World No. 19 Tim Mayotte and No. 31 Karel Nováček both on grass courts in 1990, over World No. 6 Ivan Lendl and No. 21 Henrik Holm on hard courts in 1993, World No. 14 Boris Becker on hard courts in 1994, and most impressively over World No. 2 Stefan Edberg on hard courts in 1992.  He won a main draw round at the 1993 Australian Open, over World No. 64 Richey Reneberg, 6–2 in the fifth.  In addition to his Grand Prix event triumph in São Paulo in 1990, when he beat Jaime Yzaga in the final despite dropping the first set, Weiss took three Challenger event titles - Itu-São Paulo in November 1992; Palm Springs in 1993; and Granby in 1995.

In doubles, Weiss reached a career-high ranking of World No. 271, in June 1989.  He won one Challenger - 1989 Salou, partnering Conny Falk.

Weiss resided during his junior days in Ponte Vedra Beach, Florida.

ATP career finals

Singles: 1 (1 title)

ATP Challenger and ITF Futures finals

Singles: 7 (3–4)

Doubles: 1 (1–0)

Junior Grand Slam finals

Doubles: 1 (1 title)

Performance timelines

Singles

References

External links
 
 

1966 births
Living people
American male tennis players
People from the Las Vegas Valley
People from Ponte Vedra Beach, Florida
Pepperdine Waves men's tennis players
Tennis people from Florida
Tennis players from Chicago
Tennis people from Nevada
Wimbledon junior champions
Grand Slam (tennis) champions in boys' doubles